The Pointe de Boveire is a mountain of the Pennine Alps, located between Fionnay and Liddes in the canton of Valais. It lies north of the Petit Combin, in the Grand Combin massif.

References

External links
Pointe de Boveire on Hikr

Mountains of the Alps
Alpine three-thousanders
Mountains of Valais
Mountains of Switzerland